Neusibatrachus is an extinct genus of frog, known from the Early Cretaceous (Barremian) La Pedrera de Rúbies Formation of Spain. It is one of the oldest representatives of Pipimorpha.

See also
 Prehistoric amphibian
 List of prehistoric amphibians

References

Early Cretaceous frogs
Fossils of Spain